The Houston Christian Huskies Football team, formerly known as the Houston Baptist Huskies until September of 2022, is the intercollegiate American football team for Houston Christian University located in Houston, Texas, United States. The team currently competes in the NCAA Division I Football Championship Subdivision (FCS) as a full member of the Southland Conference. Houston Christian’s (formerly known as Houston Baptist) first football team was fielded in 2013 for a seven game developmental season. The Huskies finished 2013 with a 3-4 record.  Since the 2013 games were played during a developmental season, records and statistics are considered unofficial.  The team played most of its home games at Crusader Stadium in Houston, Texas that season with one home game being played at BBVA Compass Stadium.

September 6, 2014 marked two firsts. The Huskies played their first game as an FCS team. The game against McMurry University also marked the first game played in Husky Stadium, the new on-campus stadium. The Huskies were most recently coached by Vic Shealy. September 21, 2019, HCU junior wide receiver Ben Ratzlaff hit junior H-back Coleman Robinson for a two-point conversion after the Huskies scored with 1:14 remaining to rally past South Dakota, 53-52, in a non-conference FCS matchup Saturday afternoon in the DakotaDome. This marked the biggest win in school history pushing HCU to be nationally ranked for the first time in school history sitting at 25th in the nation. 

December 13, 2022 a new era began on campus. HCU named Braxton Harris as the second head football coach in the school's history, President Robert Sloan and Director of Athletics Steve Moniaci announced at an on campus press conference.

Year-by-year results

1 The 2013 season was a developmental season.  Records and statistics are unofficial.

2 The 2014 season is the official inaugural season.

3 The 2020 Southland Conference season was cut short due to the COVID-19 pandemic and only 4 non-conference games were played.

Future non-conference opponents 
Announced schedules as of December 9, 2022.

See also
 List of NCAA Division I FCS football programs

References

External links
 

 
American football teams established in 2013
2013 establishments in Texas